On May 24, 2013, Gabriel Fernandez, an eight-year-old boy from Palmdale, California, who had been abused and tortured over a period of months, was murdered by his mother, Pearl Sinthia Fernandez, and her boyfriend, Isauro Aguirre, from whom he had received a beating two days earlier. Pearl Fernandez and Isauro Aguirre were charged and convicted of first-degree murder with special circumstances of torture. Fernandez was sentenced to life imprisonment without the possibility of parole and Aguirre was sentenced to death.

Throughout Fernandez's eight-month stay with his mother and Aguirre, multiple people reported signs of abuse to social workers with the Los Angeles County Department of Children and Family Services and the Los Angeles County Sheriff's Department. However, Fernandez was never removed from the household. This led to concerns over the effectiveness and efficiency of social services in Los Angeles County, and led to four social workers being criminally charged in Los Angeles Superior Court. All charges were later dropped.

Victim
Gabriel Daniel Fernandez was born on February 20, 2005, to Arnold Contreras and Pearl Fernandez. Shortly after birth, Gabriel was put in the custody of his great-uncle on his mother's side, Michael Lemos Carranza, and his partner David Martinez. They continued to raise Fernandez for four years. In 2009, four-year-old Gabriel moved in with his grandparents, due to his grandfather's objection to Carranza's and Martinez's same-sex relationship. He lived with his grandparents until 2012, when his mother, Pearl Fernandez, and her boyfriend, Isauro Aguirre, regained physical custody of him despite concerns for his welfare expressed by the family.

Abuse and murder
Throughout his eight-month stay in the household of Pearl Fernandez and Isauro Aguirre, Gabriel Fernandez was systematically abused and tortured. The abuse included regular physical beatings causing broken bones, being forced to eat cat litter and feces, his own vomit, and spoiled or expired foods, being burned with cigarettes, being shot with a BB gun in various areas of the body, including the face and groin, being pepper-sprayed, being forced to wear women's clothing, having to sleep bound and gagged in a small cupboard, and having his teeth knocked out with a bat. According to Fernandez's siblings, while Fernandez was being abused, his mother and stepfather would laugh. According to prosecutors, Aguirre was allegedly motivated to abuse Fernandez because he believed Fernandez was gay. The abuse and torture extended to Fernandez's siblings, except it was directed more towards Fernandez.

On May 22, 2013, Pearl Fernandez called 9-1-1 to report that her child, Gabriel Fernandez, was not breathing. Fernandez had been fatally beaten by his mother and Aguirre after failing to clean up his toys. When first responders arrived, they found him on the ground naked with several injuries. Aguirre explained to them that Fernandez was "gay". Paramedics rushed him to the hospital where doctors declared him brain dead. He passed away two days later on May 24, 2013, at the Children's Hospital Los Angeles. He died at the age of eight years old, and the official autopsy declared he died of blunt force trauma that coincided with neglect and malnutrition.

Perpetrators

Pearl Fernandez

Pearl Sinthia Fernandez was born on August 29, 1983, to Robert and Sandra Fernandez. During her childhood her father was in and out of jail, and Fernandez has claimed that her mother did not love her and would hit her as a child. At the age of nine, Fernandez began using methamphetamine and drinking alcohol, and at the age of eleven, Fernandez decided to run away from home. She dropped out of school in the 8th grade. As a teenager, Fernandez claimed that her uncle attempted to rape her and that some men had held her hostage for a period of days taking turns raping her, which led to her having suicidal thoughts while at the hospital recovering. She has four children with Arnold Contreras, including Gabriel. When Gabriel was born she abandoned him at the hospital three days after his birth; however, she regained custody of Gabriel in 2012. Additionally, she claims that many of her romantic partners, including Aguirre, were abusive to her. However, Elizabeth Carranza, Fernandez's aunt, and her husband claim that Fernandez falsely portrays herself as a victim and that it was Fernandez who was abusive and controlling towards her romantic partners. Additionally, Fernandez had pending charges against her for threatening to stab Arnold  Contreras. In the months following Gabriel's death, Pearl reported abusing the opioid drugs Oxycodone and Norco.

Fernandez has been diagnosed with several mental health issues including a depressive disorder, developmental disability, a possible personality disorder, and post-traumatic stress disorder. In 2011, Fernandez took a cognitive ability test, scoring in the 3rd percentile in the verbal comprehension portion of the test, which is on par with a typical 2nd-grade student. Clinical psychologist Deborah S. Miora stated that Fernandez is "virtually unable to use thoughts to guide her behavior and control her emotional reactions."

Currently, Fernandez is serving a life sentence without the possibility of parole for first-degree murder with special circumstances of torture at Central California Women's Facility. She was admitted to the facility on June 21, 2018.

Pearl Fernandez filed a petition on April 8, 2021 which requested being re-sentenced but this was dismissed by the Los Angeles Superior Court Judge George G. Lomeli. Lomeli said he carefully reviewed her petition for re-sentencing, but concluded that she was "not entitled to re-sentencing relief."

Isauro Aguirre

Isauro Aguirre, also known as Tony Aguirre, was born on June 13, 1980.  Aguirre repeated two grades in school and ultimately dropped out, implying a possible learning disability. He worked for Woodland Park Retirement Hotel where he was a caregiver and a driver. Executive director of the retirement home and former boss of Aguirre, Susan Weisbarth, described him as a "quiet, down to earth nice person, always willing to help." She also commented that throughout his three-year employment he was patient and loving, and would commonly change the diapers of elderly residents at the facility. Staff at the facility nicknamed him "Shaggy," which was, according to Weisbarth, a term  of endearment. Ex-coworker Sherline Mille, who also worked for Woodland Park Retirement Hotel, noted that while Aguirre was driving residents he would often drive them the scenic route so they could get to see views other than the freeway. In October 2012, Aguirre began working as a security guard for AVL Private Security; through AVL he worked at the Vallarta Market in Palmdale, California. Aguirre met Pearl Fernandez roughly a year and a half to two years before they took custody of Gabriel Fernandez. 

Aguirre was charged with first-degree murder with special circumstances of torture for murdering Gabriel Fernandez. He pled not guilty; however, the jury found him guilty and recommended he be sentenced to death, which was accepted by Superior Court Judge George G. Lomeli. He was admitted to San Quentin State Prison on June 13, 2018, awaiting execution. However, his execution has yet to be set in accordance with the moratorium on capital punishment issued by California governor Gavin Newsom. In March/April 2021, Aguirre was transferred to Richard J. Donovan Correctional Facility in San Diego.

Legal proceedings
On May 23, 2013, Pearl Fernandez and Isauro Aguirre were arrested; Fernandez was arrested for felony child endangerment while Aguirre was arrested for attempted murder. However, when Gabriel died, Fernandez and Aguirre were both charged with first degree murder with special circumstances of torture; prosecutors pursued the death penalty.

Pearl Fernandez pled guilty on February 15, 2018, to her charge as part of a plea deal to avoid the death penalty, and was sentenced to life imprisonment without the possibility of parole. In court, she stated, "I want to say I'm sorry for what happened. I wish Gabriel was alive. Every day I wish that I would have made better choices. I'm sorry to my children, and I want them to know that I love them."

Trial of Isauro Aguirre
Isauro Aguirre pleaded not guilty to the charge of first-degree murder with special circumstances of torture, and the case was prosecuted by Deputy District Attorney Jon Hatami and Deputy District Attorney Scott Yang.

In September 2017, jury selection began for the case. Questionnaires were given to prospective jurors, and they were informed that the trial could last as long as six weeks. Additionally, they were told the trial involved "extensive internal and external injuries" of the victim. The jury composition was seven women and five men.

When the trial began, jurors were given details about the extensive abuse Gabriel Fernandez went through in the months preceding his fatal beating. Prosecutor Jon Hatami called Aguirre "pure evil" and argued that he deserved the death penalty even though it "doesn't even compare to what he did to Gabriel."

Defense attorney John Alan argued that Aguirre was considered to be "kind" and "compassionate" during his employment at the retirement facility and that he had never committed a crime before meeting Pearl Fernandez.

Jury deliberation began on November 14, 2017, and a verdict was reached the next afternoon. Ultimately, the jury found him guilty of first-degree murder and guilty of the circumstances of torture charges. On December 11, 2017 jury deliberation began for the sentencing phase. The next day the jury was deadlocked; however, on December 13, they rendered a verdict of death, which was accepted by Judge George G. Lomeli.

Social workers 
The social workers associated with the Gabriel Fernandez case were Stefanie Rodriguez and Patricia Clement. The other parties associated were their supervisors, Kevin Bom and Gregory Merritt. 

The social workers were accused of neglecting Fernandez and falsifying public records.   Calls regarding child abuse concerns began to occur between the years of 2012 and 2013. The first call came in from his teacher (Jennifer Garcia).

Jennifer Garcia's concern started when Fernandez first asked her concerning questions regarding being whipped. Garcia reported her concerns to the child welfare hotline.  Stephanie Rodriguez, a social worker, was assigned to Fernandez's case.  Garcia continued to see signs of child abuse such as a fat lip, pieces of hair missing. Gabriel also claimed that he had been shot in the face with a BB gun. Garcia continued to call the child welfare hotline and was told each time that a social worker would check in on Fernandez. However, there was never a medical follow up and every time a social worker would go to Fernandez's household, she never talked directly to Fernandez and would only talk to his mother.

According to legal scholar Charlotte Hinkamp, there was sufficient evidence of child abuse and it was surprising that the Department of Children and Family Services did not remove Fernandez from his home.

The four social workers were charged with two different felonies: child abuse and falsifying public records.  However, charges were dropped in 2020 as justices in the 2nd District Court of Appeal ruled that failure to uphold their duties and failure to remove Fernandez from his abusers did not constitute criminal liability for child abuse.

Controversy of governmental response
In the months preceding his death, Fernandez showed his injuries or reported the abuse to a security guard, family members, and a teacher, which led to several calls to social services to no avail. After being hit with the metal buckle side of a belt, he asked his teacher, Jennifer Garcia, if it's "normal to bleed." In response, Garcia called social services and was later called by social worker Stefanie Rodriguez, informing her that she was assigned to the case. On another day, Fernandez came to class with chunks of hair missing and a lump on his lip. When questioned about it by Garcia, Fernandez said his mother had punched him in his mouth. After speaking with the principal, Garcia called Rodriguez back and informed her of the recent signs of abuse. Later when Fernandez reported to his teacher that he was shot in the face with a BB gun by his mother, she again informed social services of the new sign of abuse. After Fernandez missed thirteen days of school, he returned and his teacher noticed his condition had worsened. She attempted to call Rodriguez, but her call was never returned. Fernandez's great-aunt, Elizabeth Carranza, and her husband called social services three times and talked to sheriffs twice regarding the welfare of Fernandez. Twenty-nine days before Fernandez's death, Arturo Miranda Martinez, a security guard at a Los Angeles County Welfare Office, noticed extensive injuries on Fernandez's body, which prompted him to call 9-1-1, risking his job to report the injuries to sheriffs. Between 2005 and 2012, sixty complaints were filed against Pearl Fernandez and Aguirre to the Los Angeles County Department of Children and Family Services.

Two social workers, Stefanie Rodriguez and Patricia Clement, and two supervisors, Kevin Bom and Gregory Merritt of the Los Angeles County Department of Children and Family Services, were fired and charged with child abuse and falsifying public records. The unprecedented charges held significant consequences, including up to eleven years in prison. However, these charges were ultimately dismissed by California's 2nd District Court of Appeal for lack of probable cause. In January 2020, prosecutors attempted to get a rehearing for the case but eventually decided to drop the charges. Additionally, nine Sheriff's deputies were internally disciplined for not properly investigating the abuse allegations.

Media portrayal 
The Trials of Gabriel Fernandez is a six-part crime documentary that premiered on Netflix in 2020. Directed by Brian Knappenberger, the documentary details the murder of Gabriel Fernandez and subsequent responses by the media and local government.

See also
Murder of Zachary Turner
Murder of Sylvia Likens
Murder of Anthony Avalos

References

External links
Gabriel Fernandez at Find a Grave

2013 in Los Angeles
2013 in mass media
2013 murders in the United States
2010s trials
21st-century American trials
Child abuse in the United States
Child abuse resulting in death
Deaths by beating in the United States
Deaths by person in California
Incidents of violence against boys
Legal history of California
Male murder victims
May 2013 crimes in the United States
Criminal duos
Murder in Los Angeles
Palmdale, California
Psychological abuse